Sanctuary is the only compilation from new wave/synthpop band New Musik, released on Epic Records on May 1, 1981, although only in the United States. It compiles tracks from the first two albums, From A to B and Anywhere.

"They All Run After The Carving Knife" was edited down to 4:54 from its original 5:52 running length on Anywhere.

Track list

A side
"They All Run after the Carving Knife" 4:54
"Areas" 4:10
"Churches" 4:53
"Sanctuary" 4:12
"Science" 3:19
"Division" 4:20

B side
"Luxury" 3:48
"Straight Lines" 5:12
"This World of Water" 3:37
"Dead Fish (Don't Swim Home)" 5:24
"While You Wait" 5:05
"Back To Room One" 4:15

References

1981 compilation albums
New Musik albums
Epic Records compilation albums